"White America" is a political hip hop song by rapper Eminem released in 2002 from his fourth studio album, The Eminem Show. The song was also performed at the MTV Video Music Awards. It is the first full song on the album, and describes Eminem's rise to prominence and allegations from parents and politicians that he had influenced criminal behavior on young White Americans.

Lyrical content
"White America" is segued into by the opening skit "Curtains Up" on The Eminem Show, which involves Eminem walking up to a microphone to make a speech. It addresses the controversy stemming from Eminem's lyrical content, and impacting White youth, expressed with lines such as: "I speak to suburban kids, who otherwise would've never knew these words exist." "Eric" and "Erica" are representations of any White youth. Eminem also expressed his belief that his music is controversial only because it appeals to White kids, with lines such as, "Hip-hop was never a problem in Harlem, only in Boston / after it bothered the fathers of daughters starting to blossom."

Eminem also states his belief that his skin color helped with his popularity, and in effect introduced White fans to his producer, Dr. Dre, although earlier in his career it had prevented him from being taken seriously. The song also discusses the freedom of speech of the US Constitution through attacks on the then-Second Lady of the United States Lynne Cheney and her predecessor Tipper Gore, who questioned Eminem's legitimacy to freedom of speech and introduced the Parental Advisory sticker respectively.

Music video
"White America" had an animated music video that featured imagery related to the lyrics, including Eminem on a wanted poster and later being lynched while the US Constitution is torn up in the foreground. This title, although it is not a single, has a clip. This one begins with an image of a full-screen Parental Advisory logo. This cartoon then shows the doors of an elevator opening to reveal a city where we see skyscrapers, a factory and the stars and stripes. Helicopters and planes then fly over the city. We then see young people in the street in front of an advertising poster with Nike's motto, Just Do It, in Just Buy It. We can then observe two policemen hitting a young man who is on the ground. The action is hidden by the Parental Advisory logo. Behind the police car are posters of Eminem with a young man wearing a T-shirt bearing the image of the rapper. A poster indicates that Marshall Mathers (Eminem's real name) is wanted. A man then reads his newspaper where there are propaganda articles and where Uncle Sam is seen giving the middle finger, censored by the logo seen previously. Then we see a report talking about a school shooting. Both criminals are white. Eric and Erica then appear, symbolizing white America. In a supermarket is then a figurine bearing the image of Eminem. A zoom is made on his eyes which turn into dollars . We then see a hectic classroom where a math lesson is being held. Eminem is then in the studio but whites do not appreciate his work. The rapper then performs in front of a cosmopolitan audience where Eminem's logo can be seen projected into the sky. A television screen reappears and we see drug dealers. Eric and Erica then reappear. That's when we see a mother protesting in the street as these kids watch a TV show starring Eminem. The rapper writes after his lyrics while he has a noose around his neck . Eminem is then killed and a crowd of people come in front of the corpse and tear up the United States Constitution. We then see a scene showing the popularity of Eminem with young people with a crowd massing in front of a store at the release of an album. The video then advances to a devastated America with military planes flying over the city and streets covered in trash. We then see the president of the time, George W. Bush making a speech in front of the White House. It is materialized by a pig pulled by strings. He stands in front of gas cans and money. Two young white people urinate in front of the president. Airplanes then launch television sets. On these, totally destroyed, are mouths singing. Eminem wants to refer here to freedom of expression 5. At the end of the video clip, two men urinate in front of the president in front of the White House, the place of American political power.

Other use
Mother Jones magazine has stated that  the song is used in American military prisons to disorient and cause sleep deprivation among detainees. A second Eminem song, "Kim", is also used.<ref>[https://www.theguardian.com/music/musicblog/2008/feb/28/theusmilitarystorturetop1 "The US military's torture top 10", The Guardian".]</ref>

"White America" was mashed up with "Fistful of Steel" by American rock band Rage Against the Machine in DJ Vlad & Roc Raida's mixtape, Rock Phenomenon.'' It was released on the mixtape on March 27, 2006, and, due to much critical praise, was re-released on July 10, 2007.

Certifications

References

2002 singles
2002 songs
Eminem songs
Songs against racism and xenophobia
Political rap songs
Rap rock songs
Works about White Americans
Songs about white people
Songs written by Jeff Bass
Songs written by Eminem
Songs written by Luis Resto (musician)
Political songs